Dubnium is a synthetic chemical element with the symbol Db and atomic number 105. It is highly radioactive: the most stable known isotope, dubnium-268, has a half-life of about 16 hours. This greatly limits extended research on the element.

Dubnium does not occur naturally on Earth and is produced artificially. The Soviet Joint Institute for Nuclear Research (JINR) claimed the first discovery of the element in 1968, followed by the American Lawrence Berkeley Laboratory in 1970. Both teams proposed their names for the new element and used them without formal approval. The long-standing dispute was resolved in 1993 by an official investigation of the discovery claims by the Transfermium Working Group, formed by the International Union of Pure and Applied Chemistry and the International Union of Pure and Applied Physics, resulting in credit for the discovery being officially shared between both teams. The element was formally named dubnium in 1997 after the town of Dubna, the site of the JINR.

Theoretical research establishes dubnium as a member of group 5 in the 6d series of transition metals, placing it under vanadium, niobium, and tantalum. Dubnium should share most properties, such as its valence electron configuration and having a dominant +5 oxidation state, with the other group 5 elements, with a few anomalies due to relativistic effects. A limited investigation of dubnium chemistry has confirmed this.

Introduction

Discovery

Background
Uranium, element 92, is the heaviest element to occur in significant quantities in nature; heavier elements can only be practically produced by synthesis. The first synthesis of a new element—neptunium, element 93—was achieved in 1940 by a team of researchers in the United States. In the following years, American scientists synthesized the elements up to mendelevium, element 101, which was synthesized in 1955. From element 102, the priority of discoveries was contested between American and Soviet physicists. Their rivalry resulted in a race for new elements and credit for their discoveries, later named the Transfermium Wars.

Reports 

The first report of the discovery of element 105 came from the Joint Institute for Nuclear Research (JINR) in Dubna, Moscow Oblast, Soviet Union, in April 1968. The scientists bombarded 243Am with a beam of 22Ne ions, and reported 9.4 MeV (with a half-life of 0.1–3 seconds) and 9.7 MeV (t1/2 > 0.05 s) alpha activities followed by alpha activities similar to those of either 256103 or 257103. Based on prior theoretical predictions, the two activity lines were assigned to 261105 and 260105, respectively.

 +  → 265−x105 + x  (x = 4, 5)

After observing the alpha decays of element 105, the researchers aimed to observe spontaneous fission (SF) of the element and study the resulting fission fragments. They assigned the former activity to 242mfAm and ascribed the latter activity to an isotope of element 105. They suggested that it was unlikely that this activity could come from a transfer reaction instead of element 105, because the yield ratio for this reaction was significantly lower than that of the 242mfAm-producing transfer reaction, in accordance with theoretical predictions. To establish that this activity was not from a (22Ne,xn) reaction, the researchers bombarded a 243Am target with 18O ions; reactions producing 256103 and 257103 showed very little SF activity (matching the established data), and the reaction producing heavier 258103 and 259103 produced no SF activity at all, in line with theoretical data. The researchers concluded that the activities observed came from SF of element 105.

In April 1970, a team at Lawrence Berkeley Laboratory (LBL), in Berkeley, California, United States, claimed to have synthesized element 105 by bombarding californium-249 with nitrogen-15 ions, with an alpha activity of 9.1 MeV. To ensure this activity was not from a different reaction, the team attempted other reactions: bombarding 249Cf with 14N, Pb with 15N, and Hg with 15N. They stated no such activity was found in those reactions. The characteristics of the daughter nuclei matched those of 256103, implying that the parent nuclei were of 260105.

 +  → 260105 + 4 

These results did not confirm the JINR findings regarding the 9.4 MeV or 9.7 MeV alpha decay of 260105, leaving only 261105 as a possibly produced isotope.

JINR then attempted another experiment to create element 105, published in a report in May 1970. They claimed that they had synthesized more nuclei of element 105 and that the experiment confirmed their previous work. According to the paper, the isotope produced by JINR was probably 261105, or possibly 260105. This report included an initial chemical examination: the thermal gradient version of the gas-chromatography method was applied to demonstrate that the chloride of what had formed from the SF activity nearly matched that of niobium pentachloride, rather than hafnium tetrachloride. The team identified a 2.2-second SF activity in a volatile chloride portraying eka-tantalum properties, and inferred that the source of the SF activity must have been element 105.

In June 1970, JINR made improvements on their first experiment, using a purer target and reducing the intensity of transfer reactions by installing a collimator before the catcher. This time, they were able to find 9.1 MeV alpha activities with daughter isotopes identifiable as either 256103 or 257103, implying that the original isotope was either 260105 or 261105.

Naming controversy 

JINR did not propose a name after their first report claiming synthesis of element 105, which would have been the usual practice. This led LBL to believe that JINR did not have enough experimental data to back their claim. After collecting more data, JINR proposed the name bohrium (Bo) in honor of the Danish nuclear physicist Niels Bohr, a founder of the theories of atomic structure and quantum theory; they soon changed their proposal to nielsbohrium (Ns) to avoid confusion with boron. Another proposed name was dubnium. When LBL first announced their synthesis of element 105, they proposed that the new element be named hahnium (Ha) after the German chemist Otto Hahn, the "father of nuclear chemistry", thus creating an element naming controversy.

In the early 1970s, both teams reported synthesis of the next element, element 106, but did not suggest names. JINR suggested establishing an international committee to clarify the discovery criteria. This proposal was accepted in 1974 and a neutral joint group formed. Neither team showed interest in resolving the conflict through a third party, so the leading scientists of LBL—Albert Ghiorso and Glenn Seaborg—traveled to Dubna in 1975 and met with the leading scientists of JINR—Georgy Flerov, Yuri Oganessian, and others—to try to resolve the conflict internally and render the neutral joint group unnecessary; after two hours of discussions, this failed. The joint neutral group never assembled to assess the claims, and the conflict remained unresolved. In 1979, IUPAC suggested systematic element names to be used as placeholders until permanent names were established; under it, element 105 would be unnilpentium, from the Latin roots un- and nil- and the Greek root pent- (meaning "one", "zero", and "five", respectively, the digits of the atomic number). Both teams ignored it as they did not wish to weaken their outstanding claims.

In 1981, the Gesellschaft für Schwerionenforschung (GSI; Society for Heavy Ion Research) in Darmstadt, Hesse, West Germany, claimed synthesis of element 107; their report came out five years after the first report from JINR but with greater precision, making a more solid claim on discovery. GSI acknowledged JINR's efforts by suggesting the name nielsbohrium for the new element. JINR did not suggest a new name for element 105, stating it was more important to determine its discoverers first.

In 1985, the International Union of Pure and Applied Chemistry (IUPAC) and the International Union of Pure and Applied Physics (IUPAP) formed a Transfermium Working Group (TWG) to assess discoveries and establish final names for the controversial elements. The party held meetings with delegates from the three competing institutes; in 1990, they established criteria on recognition of an element, and in 1991, they finished the work on assessing discoveries and disbanded. These results were published in 1993. According to the report, the first definitely successful experiment was the April 1970 LBL experiment, closely followed by the June 1970 JINR experiment, so credit for the discovery of the element should be shared between the two teams.

LBL said that the input from JINR was overrated in the review. They claimed JINR was only able to unambiguously demonstrate the synthesis of element 105 a year after they did. JINR and GSI endorsed the report.

In 1994, IUPAC published a recommendation on naming the disputed elements. For element 105, they proposed joliotium (Jl) after the French physicist Frédéric Joliot-Curie, a contributor to the development of nuclear physics and chemistry; this name was originally proposed by the Soviet team for element 102, which by then had long been called nobelium. This recommendation was criticized by the American scientists for several reasons. Firstly, their suggestions were scrambled: the names rutherfordium and hahnium, originally suggested by Berkeley for elements 104 and 105, were respectively reassigned to elements 106 and 108. Secondly, elements 104 and 105 were given names favored by JINR, despite earlier recognition of LBL as an equal co-discoverer for both of them. Thirdly and most importantly, IUPAC rejected the name seaborgium for element 106, having just approved a rule that an element could not be named after a living person, even though the 1993 report had given the LBL team the sole credit for its discovery.

In 1995, IUPAC abandoned the controversial rule and established a committee of national representatives aimed at finding a compromise. They suggested seaborgium for element 106 in exchange for the removal of all the other American proposals, except for the established name lawrencium for element 103. The equally entrenched name nobelium for element 102 was replaced by flerovium after Georgy Flerov, following the recognition by the 1993 report that that element had been first synthesized in Dubna. This was rejected by American scientists and the decision was retracted. The name flerovium was later used for element 114.

In 1996, IUPAC held another meeting, reconsidered all names in hand, and accepted another set of recommendations; it was approved and published in 1997. Element 105 was named dubnium (Db), after Dubna in Russia, the location of the JINR; the American suggestions were used for elements 102, 103, 104, and 106. The name dubnium had been used for element 104 in the previous IUPAC recommendation. The American scientists "reluctantly" approved this decision. IUPAC pointed out that the Berkeley laboratory had already been recognized several times, in the naming of berkelium, californium, and americium, and that the acceptance of the names rutherfordium and seaborgium for elements 104 and 106 should be offset by recognizing JINR's contributions to the discovery of elements 104, 105, and 106.

Even after 1997, LBL still sometimes used the name hahnium for element 105 in their own material, doing so as recently as 2014. However, the problem was resolved in the literature as Jens Volker Kratz, editor of Radiochimica Acta, refused to accept papers not using the 1997 IUPAC nomenclature.

Isotopes 

Dubnium, having an atomic number of 105, is a superheavy element; like all elements with such high atomic numbers, it is very unstable. The longest-lasting known isotope of dubnium, 268Db, has a half-life of around a day. No stable isotopes have been seen, and a 2012 calculation by JINR suggested that the half-lives of all dubnium isotopes would not significantly exceed a day. Dubnium can only be obtained by artificial production.

The short half-life of dubnium limits experimentation. This is exacerbated by the fact that the most stable isotopes are the hardest to synthesize. Elements with a lower atomic number have stable isotopes with a lower neutron–proton ratio than those with higher atomic number, meaning that the target and beam nuclei that could be employed to create the superheavy element have fewer neutrons than needed to form these most stable isotopes. (Different techniques based on rapid neutron capture and transfer reactions are being considered as of the 2010s, but those based on the collision of a large and small nucleus still dominate research in the area.)

Only a few atoms of 268Db can be produced in each experiment, and thus the measured lifetimes vary significantly during the process. As of 2022, following additional experiments performed at the JINR's Superheavy Element Factory (which started operations in 2019), the half-life of 268Db is measured to be  hours. The second most stable isotope, 270Db, has been produced in even smaller quantities: three atoms in total, with lifetimes of 33.4 h, 1.3 h, and 1.6 h. These two are the heaviest isotopes of dubnium to date, and both were produced as a result of decay of the heavier nuclei 288Mc and 294Ts rather than directly, because the experiments that yielded them were originally designed in Dubna for 48Ca beams. For its mass, 48Ca has by far the greatest neutron excess of all practically stable nuclei, both quantitative and relative, which correspondingly helps synthesize superheavy nuclei with more neutrons, but this gain is compensated by the decreased likelihood of fusion for high atomic numbers.

Predicted properties 
According to the periodic law, dubnium should belong to group 5, with vanadium, niobium, and tantalum. Several studies have investigated the properties of element 105 and found that they generally agreed with the predictions of the periodic law. Significant deviations may nevertheless occur, due to relativistic effects, which dramatically change physical properties on both atomic and macroscopic scales. These properties have remained challenging to measure for several reasons: the difficulties of production of superheavy atoms, the low rates of production, which only allows for microscopic scales, requirements for a radiochemistry laboratory to test the atoms, short half-lives of those atoms, and the presence of many unwanted activities apart from those of synthesis of superheavy atoms. So far, studies have only been performed on single atoms.

Atomic and physical 

A direct relativistic effect is that as the atomic numbers of elements increase, the innermost electrons begin to revolve faster around the nucleus as a result of an increase of electromagnetic attraction between an electron and a nucleus. Similar effects have been found for the outermost s orbitals (and p1/2 ones, though in dubnium they are not occupied): for example, the 7s orbital contracts by 25% in size and is stabilized by 2.6 eV.

A more indirect effect is that the contracted s and p1/2 orbitals shield the charge of the nucleus more effectively, leaving less for the outer d and f electrons, which therefore move in larger orbitals. Dubnium is greatly affected by this: unlike the previous group 5 members, its 7s electrons are slightly more difficult to extract than its 6d electrons.

Another effect is the spin–orbit interaction, particularly spin–orbit splitting, which splits the 6d subshell—the azimuthal quantum number ℓ of a d shell is 2—into two subshells, with four of the ten orbitals having their ℓ lowered to 3/2 and six raised to 5/2. All ten energy levels are raised; four of them are lower than the other six. (The three 6d electrons normally occupy the lowest energy levels, 6d3/2.)

A singly ionized atom of dubnium (Db+) should lose a 6d electron compared to a neutral atom; the doubly (Db2+) or triply (Db3+) ionized atoms of dubnium should eliminate 7s electrons, unlike its lighter homologs. Despite the changes, dubnium is still expected to have five valence electrons; 7p energy levels have not been shown to influence dubnium and its properties. As the 6d orbitals of dubnium are more destabilized than the 5d ones of tantalum, and Db3+ is expected to have two 6d, rather than 7s, electrons remaining, the resulting +3 oxidation state is expected to be unstable and even rarer than that of tantalum. The ionization potential of dubnium in its maximum +5 oxidation state should be slightly lower than that of tantalum and the ionic radius of dubnium should increase compared to tantalum; this has a significant effect on dubnium's chemistry.

Atoms of dubnium in the solid state should arrange themselves in a body-centered cubic configuration, like the previous group 5 elements. The predicted density of dubnium is 21.6 g/cm3.

Chemical 

Computational chemistry is simplest in gas-phase chemistry, in which interactions between molecules may be ignored as negligible. Multiple authors have researched dubnium pentachloride; calculations show it to be consistent with the periodic laws by exhibiting the properties of a compound of a group 5 element. For example, the molecular orbital levels indicate that dubnium uses three 6d electron levels as expected. Compared to its tantalum analog, dubnium pentachloride is expected to show increased covalent character: a decrease in the effective charge on an atom and an increase in the overlap population (between orbitals of dubnium and chlorine).

Calculations of solution chemistry indicate that the maximum oxidation state of dubnium, +5, will be more stable than those of niobium and tantalum and the +3 and +4 states will be less stable. The tendency towards hydrolysis of cations with the highest oxidation state should continue to decrease within group 5 but is still expected to be quite rapid. Complexation of dubnium is expected to follow group 5 trends in its richness. Calculations for hydroxo-chlorido- complexes have shown a reversal in the trends of complex formation and extraction of group 5 elements, with dubnium being more prone to do so than tantalum.

Experimental chemistry 
Experimental results of the chemistry of dubnium date back to 1974 and 1976. JINR researchers used a thermochromatographic system and concluded that the volatility of dubnium bromide was less than that of niobium bromide and about the same as that of hafnium bromide. It is not certain that the detected fission products confirmed that the parent was indeed element 105. These results may imply that dubnium behaves more like hafnium than niobium.

The next studies on the chemistry of dubnium were conducted in 1988, in Berkeley. They examined whether the most stable oxidation state of dubnium in aqueous solution was +5. Dubnium was fumed twice and washed with concentrated nitric acid; sorption of dubnium on glass cover slips was then compared with that of the group 5 elements niobium and tantalum and the group 4 elements zirconium and hafnium produced under similar conditions. The group 5 elements are known to sorb on glass surfaces; the group 4 elements do not. Dubnium was confirmed as a group 5 member. Surprisingly, the behavior on extraction from mixed nitric and hydrofluoric acid solution into methyl isobutyl ketone differed between dubnium, tantalum, and niobium. Dubnium did not extract and its behavior resembled niobium more closely than tantalum, indicating that complexing behavior could not be predicted purely from simple extrapolations of trends within a group in the periodic table.

This prompted further exploration of the chemical behavior of complexes of dubnium. Various labs jointly conducted thousands of repetitive chromatographic experiments between 1988 and 1993. All group 5 elements and protactinium were extracted from concentrated hydrochloric acid; after mixing with lower concentrations of hydrogen chloride, small amounts of hydrogen fluoride were added to start selective re-extraction. Dubnium showed behavior different from that of tantalum but similar to that of niobium and its pseudohomolog protactinium at concentrations of hydrogen chloride below 12 moles per liter. After extraction experiments of dubnium from hydrogen bromide into diisobutyl carbinol (2,6-dimethylheptan-4-ol), a specific extractant for protactinium, with subsequent elutions with the hydrogen chloride/hydrogen fluoride mix as well as hydrogen chloride, dubnium was found to be less prone to extraction than either protactinium or niobium. This was explained as an increasing tendency to form non‐extractable complexes of multiple negative charges. Further experiments in 1992 confirmed the stability of the +5 state: Db(V) was shown to be extractable from cation‐exchange columns with α‐hydroxyisobutyrate, like the group 5 elements and protactinium; Db(III) and Db(IV) were not. In 1998 and 1999, new predictions suggested that dubnium would extract nearly as well as niobium and better than tantalum from halide solutions, which was later confirmed.

The first isothermal gas chromatography experiments were performed in 1992 with 262Db (half-life 35 seconds). The volatilities for niobium and tantalum were similar within error limits, but dubnium appeared to be significantly less volatile. Later volatility studies of chlorides of dubnium and niobium as a function of controlled partial pressures of oxygen showed that formation of oxychlorides and general volatility are dependent on concentrations of oxygen. The oxychlorides were shown to be less volatile than the chlorides.

In 2004–05, researchers from Dubna and Livermore identified a new dubnium isotope, 268Db, as a fivefold alpha decay product of the newly created element 115. This new isotope proved to be long-lived enough to allow further chemical experimentation, with a half-life of over a day. In the 2004 experiment, a thin layer with dubnium was removed from the surface of the target and dissolved in aqua regia with tracers and a lanthanum carrier, from which various +3, +4, and +5 species were precipitated on adding ammonium hydroxide. The precipitate was washed and dissolved in hydrochloric acid, where it converted to nitrate form and was then dried on a film and counted. Mostly containing a +5 species, which was immediately assigned to dubnium, it also had a +4 species; based on that result, the team decided that additional chemical separation was needed. In 2005, the experiment was repeated, with the final product being hydroxide rather than nitrate precipitate, which was processed further in both Livermore (based on reverse phase chromatography) and Dubna (based on anion exchange chromatography). The +5 species was effectively isolated; dubnium appeared three times in tantalum-only fractions and never in niobium-only fractions. It was noted that these experiments were insufficient to draw conclusions about the general chemical profile of dubnium.

In 2009, at the JAEA tandem accelerator in Japan, dubnium was processed in nitric and hydrofluoric acid solution, at concentrations where niobium forms  and tantalum forms . Dubnium's behavior was close to that of niobium but not tantalum; it was thus deduced that dubnium formed . From the available information, it was concluded that dubnium often behaved like niobium, sometimes like protactinium, but rarely like tantalum.

In 2021, the volatile heavy group 5 oxychlorides MOCl3 (M = Nb, Ta, Db) were experimentally studied at the JAEA tandem accelerator. The trend in volatilities was found to be NbOCl3 > TaOCl3 ≥ DbOCl3, so that dubnium behaves in line with periodic trends.

Notes

References

Bibliography 
 
 
 
 
 

 
Chemical elements
Transition metals
Synthetic elements
Chemical elements with body-centered cubic structure